Bapu Zimidar is a Punjabi song by Jassie Gill. The song was written by Happy Raikoti and music was composed by Jatinder Shah. This music video was directed by Virsa Arts. The song was released on 14 October 2014 under the label Speed Records. The song appeared in the UK Asian Music Chart (BBC) and Apple Music India Daily Chart. Bapu Zimidar has crossed 577 Million views on YouTube February 2023.

Personnel
 Song: Bapu Zimidar
 Artist: Jassie Gill
 Lyrics: Happy Raikoti
 Music: Jatinder Shah
 Video Director: Virsa Arts
 Label: Speed Records

References 

Punjabi music